The PAD Factory is a historic factory building located at Ticonderoga in Essex County, New York.  It was built in 1893 and is a 3-story, five-by-three-bay brick industrial building with a fieldstone foundation and a low pitched gable roof.  It was originally built for the manufacture of blank books, but was used almost immediately for a variety of purposes including a temporary school and shirt factory.  It was converted for residential and commercial uses in 1981.

It was listed on the National Register of Historic Places in 1988.

References

Industrial buildings and structures on the National Register of Historic Places in New York (state)
Industrial buildings completed in 1893
Buildings and structures in Essex County, New York
National Register of Historic Places in Essex County, New York